Bronze horse may refer to:

 Bronze Horse Award, the grand prize of the Stockholm International Film Festival
 Le cheval de bronze (The Bronze Horse), an opera by Daniel Auber
 Bronze (horse), a highly successful and influential broodmare